Navarasa is a 2005 Indian Tamil language film directed by Santosh Sivan. It has met with a strong reception since its release, and has been shown at many film festivals across the world including the Singapore International Film Festival, the Pusan International Film Festival, Korea, the Taipei Golden Horse Film Festival, Taiwan, the São Paulo International Film Festival, Brazil and the Lyon Asian Film Festival, France among others. In January, 2006 it was selected as an official entry to the International Film Festival Rotterdam.

Plot 
The film revolves around the story of a young girl Shweta taking her first steps towards adulthood. Ready for the adventure, the thirteen-year-old is upbeat, however soon discovers that every night, her uncle Gautam (Kushboo) transforms himself into a woman to lead a completely different life. When Shweta confronts Gautam on the matter, Gautam tells her he wishes to run away and marry Aravan at a local festival, the Koovagam Festival. The festival is held annually where people of the third gender regularly meet to re-enact the story of Aravan, a character from the epic Mahabharata. Shweta decides to find her uncle and bring him back home, and along the way, she makes new friends of the third gender, and discovers a whole new culture.

Cast 
P. Shwetha
Kushboo
Bobby Darling
Ejji K. Umamahesh

Awards 
The film has won the following awards since its release:

2005 Monaco International Film Festival (Monaco)
 Won – Best Supporting Actor – Bobby Darling
 Won – Angel Independent Spirit Award – Navarasa – Santosh Sivan
2005 National Film Awards (India)
 Won – Silver Lotus Award – Best Regional Film (Tamil) – Navarasa – Santosh Sivan

References

External links 
Navarasa: Official Site
 

2000s Tamil-language films
2005 films
Best Tamil Feature Film National Film Award winners
Films directed by Santosh Sivan